Myloplus levis is a medium to large omnivorous fish of the family Serrasalmidae from South America, where found in the Paraguay-Paraná River basin.

References

Jégu, M., 2003. Serrasalminae (Pacus and piranhas). p. 182-196. In R.E. Reis, S.O. Kullander and C.J. Ferraris, Jr. (eds.) Checklist of the Freshwater Fishes of South and Central America. Porto Alegre: EDIPUCRS, Brasil.

Serrasalmidae
Taxa named by Carl H. Eigenmann
Taxa named by Waldo Lee McAtee
Fish described in 1907
Freshwater fish of South America